Brain Candy may refer to:

 Brain Candy (TV series), 2003 standup comedy variety TV series on BBC Three
 Brain Candy (album), 2020 album by Australian duo Hockey Dad
 Kids in the Hall: Brain Candy, 1996 Canadian comedy film by The Kids in the Hall, directed by Kelly Makin